Roger A. Pielke Jr. (born November 2, 1968) is an American political scientist and professor, and was the director of the Sports Governance Center within the Department of Athletics at the Center for Science and Technology Policy Research at the University of Colorado Boulder.

He previously served in the Environmental Studies Program and was a Fellow of the Cooperative Institute for Research in Environmental Sciences (CIRES) where he served as director of the  Center for Science and Technology Policy Research at the University of Colorado Boulder from 2001 to 2007.  Pielke was a visiting scholar at Oxford University's Saïd Business School in the 2007–2008 academic year.

A prolific writer, his interests include understanding the politicization of science; decision making under uncertainty; policy education for scientists in areas such as climate change, disaster mitigation, and world trade; and research on the governance of sports organizations, including FIFA and the NCAA.

Education and background 
Pielke earned a B.A. in mathematics (1990), an M.A. in public policy (1992), and a Ph.D. in political science, all from the University of Colorado Boulder.  Prior to his positions at CU-Boulder, from 1993 to 2001 he was a staff scientist in the Environmental and Societal Impacts Group of the National Center for Atmospheric Research.  From 2002 to 2004 Pielke was director of graduate studies for the CU-Boulder Graduate Program in Environmental Studies and in 2001 students selected him for the Outstanding Graduate Advisor Award.  Pielke serves on numerous editorial boards and advisory committees, retains many professional affiliations, and sat on the board of directors of  WeatherData, Inc. from 2001 to 2006.  In 2012 he was awarded an honorary doctorate by Linköping University and the Public Service Award of the Geological Society of America.

Professional writing 
Pielke's early work was on the Space Shuttle program. In 1993 he argued that the shuttle was expensive and risky — that it was "probable" that another orbiter would be lost within 20–35 flights. Shortly before the loss of Columbia he warned that loss of another shuttle was only a matter of time.  He has also been critical of the space station program.

Pielke has also written extensively on climate change policy. He has written that he accepts the IPCC view of the underlying science, stating, "The IPCC has concluded that greenhouse gas emissions resulting from human activity are an important driver of changes in climate. And on this basis alone I am personally convinced that it makes sense to take action to limit greenhouse gas emissions." He also states that, "Any conceivable emissions reductions policies, even if successful, cannot have a perceptible impact on the climate for many decades", and from this he concludes that, "In coming decades the only policies that can effectively be used to manage the immediate effects of climate variability and change will be adaptive."

On the issues of hurricanes and climate change he has argued that the trend in increasing damage from hurricanes is primarily due to societal and economic factors (chiefly an increase in wealth density), rather than change in the frequency and intensity.

A "Guide to Climate Skeptics" published by Foreign Policy notes that Pielke's published views have led to him being considered by some a "denier" of climate change and by others as an "alarmist". In October 2016, in a hacked email disclosed by WikiLeaks, Judd Legum states that a ThinkProgress blog was instrumental in his firing from the FiveThirtyEight website.

In April 2015, Pielke joined with a group issuing An Ecomodernist Manifesto. The other authors were: John Asafu-Adjaye, Linus Blomqvist, Stewart Brand, Barry Brook. Ruth DeFries, Erle Ellis, Christopher Foreman, David Keith, Martin Lewis, Mark Lynas, Ted Nordhaus, Rachel Pritzker, Joyashree Roy, Mark Sagoff, Michael Shellenberger, Robert Stone, and Peter Teague.

Pielke was named in a letter sent by Representative Raúl Grijalva (D-AZ) to institutions that employed scientists who had testified to Congress about climate change. The letter stated, "My colleagues and I cannot perform our duties if research or testimony provided to us is influenced by undisclosed financial relationships," and requested information including the sources and amounts of outside funding for those scientists who had testified.  

Pielke rebuked Grijalva's investigation into alleged financial influence on him by fossil fuel companies. "I have no funding, declared or undeclared, with any fossil fuel company or interest. I never have. Representative Grijalva knows this too, because when I have testified before the US Congress, I have disclosed my funding and possible conflicts of interest... the Congressman and his staff, along with compliant journalists, are busy characterizing me in public as a 'climate skeptic' opposed to action on climate change. This of course is a lie. I have written a book calling for a carbon tax, I have publicly supported President Obama’s proposed EPA carbon regulations, and I have just published another book strongly defending the scientific assessment of the IPCC with respect to disasters and climate change." Pielke stated in a blog post published after Grijalva began demanding Pielke's employer to disclose all of Pielke's personal correspondence (including draft letters) as it related to climate science.

Pielke contends that Democratic members of Congress were motivated by political and partisan interests. He believes that he was targeted due to his echoing of IPCC opinion that it is 'incorrect to associate the increasing costs of disasters with the emission of greenhouse gases'.

Publications
Editor, with Daniel Sarewitz and Radford Byerly Jr., Prediction: Science, Decision Making, and the Future of Nature, Island Press; New title edition (April 1, 2000), hardcover, 400 pages, 
The Honest Broker: Making Sense of Science in Policy and Politics, Cambridge University Press (May 14, 2007), hardcover, 198 pages, 
The Climate Fix: What Scientists and Politicians Won't Tell You About Global Warming, Basic Books (September 28, 2010), hardcover, 288 pages 
The Rightful Place of Science: Disasters and Climate Change, Consortium for Science, Policy & Outcomes (November 1, 2014), trade paperback, 124 pages 
The Edge: The War Against Cheating and Corruption in the Cutthroat World of Elite Sports, with Simon Kuper, Roaring Forties Press (29 September 2016), paperback, 288 pages 
List of publications at sciencepolicy.colorado.edu

See also 
 Roger A. Pielke (atmospheric scientist; his father)

References

External links 
 CU-Boulder homepage
Forbes articles series by Pielke
 Prometheus – blog discussing science policy issues with frequent posts from Pielke, up to June 2009
 Roger Pielke Jr.'s Blog – personal blog which replaced Prometheus, 2009 to 2015, now closed
 Pielke's Twitter account

1968 births
Living people
American political scientists
American political writers
American male non-fiction writers
American science writers
University of Colorado alumni
University of Colorado faculty